Varichaetadrilus is a genus of annelids belonging to the family Naididae.

The species of this genus are found in Eurasia and Northern America.

Species:
 Varichaetadrilus bizkaiensis Rodriguez & Giani, 1984 
 Varichaetadrilus fulleri Brinkhurst & Kathman, 1983

References

Annelids